Lug or LUG may refer to:

Places

Bosnia and Herzegovina
 Lug (Bugojno), a village
 Lug (Derventa), a suburb in Bosanska Posavina
 Lug, Jablanica, a village
 Lug (Kiseljak), a village
 Lug, Prozor, a village
 Lug, Tomislavgrad, a village

Croatia
 Lug, Bilje, a settlement in Croatian Baranja
 Lug, Karlovac County, a village
 Lug, Lika-Senj County

Ireland
 Lug, a townland in Durrow, County Offaly, barony of Ballycowan
 Lugnaquilla, a mountain often abbreviated as Lug

Serbia
 Lug (Bajina Bašta), a village
 Lug (Beočin), a village

Other countries
 Lug, Germany, a municipality in Südwestpfalz district, Rhineland-Palatinate
 Ług, Łódź Voivodeship, a village in Poland

Handles or connectors
 Lug (electrical connector), a bolt on an enclosure tied to an electric potential within the enclosure, supporting the connection of a cable
 Lug (hinge), a protuberance of a hinge, featuring a hole for the axis of the hinge
 Lug (knob), handles are a kind of flattened knob attached to the side of pottery
 Locking lug, a protrusion on a firearm's bolt head that help securing it into the receiver or barrel
 Lug, part of a drum used in conjunction with tension rods and counter hoops to tension the drum head in relation to the shell
 Lug, the  protrusion from the case of a wristwatch to which the strap or bracelet attaches, usually by means of spring bars that bridge pairs of lugs at the upper and lower sides of a watch's case
 Bayonet lug, a metal mount for a long gun that either locks a bayonet onto the weapon or provides a base for the bayonet to rest against
 Lug nut, a fastener, specifically a nut, used to secure a wheel on a vehicle

Brands and enterprises
 Last Unicorn Games (or LUG), games publisher later absorbed by Wizards of the Coast
 Level Up! Games (or LUG), the leading portal and brand name for locally published online games in the Philippines
 Lug, a brand of luggage

Organizations
 LEGO Users Group (or LUG), a group of people who meet to discuss and participate in the LEGO hobby
 Linux User Group (or LUG), private organization providing support for Linux users

Transportation
 Lug (bicycle part), steel tubing and sockets of a bicycle
 Lug or grouser, the portion of the tread design in a tire that contacts the road surface
 Lug sail, a four sided sail bent to a yard
 Lugano Airport, IATA Airport Code LUG, a regional airport located west of the Swiss city of Lugano 
 Lugging, damage -prone mode  of operation in internal combustion engines

Other uses
 Lug or Lugh, an ancient god in Irish mythology
 Law of Universal Gravitation (or LUG), Isaac Newton's equations for gravity
 Lesbian until graduation (or LUG), slang term